Barbara Ann Loden (July 8, 1932September 5, 1980) was an American actress and director of film and theater. Richard Brody of The New Yorker described Loden as the "female
counterpart to John Cassavetes".

Born and raised in North Carolina, Loden began her career at an early age in New York City as a commercial model and chorus-line dancer. Loden became a regular sidekick on the irreverent Ernie Kovacs Television Show in the mid-1950s and was a lifetime member of the famed Actors Studio. She appeared in several projects directed by her second husband, Elia Kazan, including Splendor in the Grass (1961). Her subsequent performance in a 1964 Broadway production of After the Fall earned her a Tony Award for Best Featured Actress.

In 1970, Loden wrote, directed, and starred in Wanda, a groundbreaking independent film that won the International Critics Award at the 1970 Venice Film Festival. Throughout the 1970s, she continued to work directing Off-Broadway and regional theater productions, as well as direct two short films. In 1978, Loden was diagnosed with breast cancer, of which she died two years later, aged 48.

Life and career

1932–1954: Childhood and early years
Loden was born on July 8, 1932 in Asheville, North Carolina. Her father was a barber, and she described herself as a "hill-billy's daughter." Upon her parents' divorce in her early childhood, Loden was raised by her religious maternal grandparents in the Appalachian Mountains in rural Marion, North Carolina. She described her childhood as emotionally impoverished. Loden was described as a shy, humble, statuesque and soft-spoken loner. At age 16, she moved to New York City, where she began working as a model for detective and romance magazines. Loden found minor success as a pin-up girl, model, and dancer at the Copacabana nightclub before studying at the Actors Studio, intending to become an actress. At the time, she professed to hate film, saying, "People on the screen were perfect and they made me feel inferior."

1955–1959: Early theater and television work
Loden made her New York theater debut in 1957 in Compulsion and also appeared on stage in The Highest Tree with Robert Redford as well as Night Circus with Ben Gazzara. She joined the cast of The Ernie Kovacs Show as a "scantily clad" sidekick to Kovacs, a job that her first husband, television producer and film distributor Larry Joachim, helped her obtain. She said she owed a lot to Kovacs, as another producer on the show had initially vetoed Kovacs's decision to hire her. In interviews, Loden said, "Ernie felt sorry for me" and gave her another job as a stunt sidekick, rolling around in a rug or getting hit in the face with a pie.

1960–1966: Film; marriage to Elia Kazan

In 1960, Loden appeared in Elia Kazan's film Wild River as Montgomery Clift's secretary. She was perhaps better known for her role in Splendor in the Grass (1961), in which she played Warren Beatty's sister.

She famously portrayed Maggie, a fictionalized version of Marilyn Monroe, in Kazan's Lincoln Center Repertory Company stage production of After the Fall (1964), which was written by Monroe's former husband, playwright Arthur Miller. Loden received a Tony award for best actress for her performance in After the Fall as well as an annual award of the Outer Circle, an organization of writers who covered Broadway for national magazines. After the Fall reviews called Loden the "new Jean Harlow" and a "blonde bombshell." Loden recalled in 1980 that she was drawn to the part because the script reflected her own life experiences.

Loden married her first husband, film and television producer and film distributor Larry Joachim, in the 1950s, and they had a son, Marco. After an affair while they were both married to other people, Loden married film director Elia Kazan, who was 23 years her senior, in 1966. She had another son, Leo, with Kazan, and though estranged and considering divorce, they were still married at the time of her death from breast cancer at the age of 48.

Kazan could be contemptuous when describing his relationship with Loden. In his autobiography, Elia Kazan: A Life, he revealed his desire and inability to control her. Kazan wrote about Loden "with a mix of affection and patronization, emphasizing her sexuality and her backcountry feistiness." In a "condescending" way, Kazan bemoaned that Loden had depended on her "sexual appeal" to get ahead and that he was afraid of "losing her." But Kazan was also, in his words, "protective" of Loden. In turn, Loden felt inferior to Kazan.

Her acting career on film had a troubled history. Her first major film role was to be in the Frank Perry-directed The Swimmer starring Burt Lancaster, but during post-production there was a dispute about the scene between producer Sam Spiegel and the film's writer-director team, the Perrys. According to notes by screenwriter Eleanor Perry, Spiegel began showing the troubled rough cut of the film around Hollywood, polling several of his famous film director friends about what he should do with it. Kazan was a major film director who had great influence. He had also secretly been shown a private screening of the film by his friend and producer Spiegel (producer of Kazan's On the Waterfront) and had reportedly interfered with the final cut. Perry was ultimately fired from the film. Several of the film's scenes were recast and reshot by Sydney Pollack, who was hired to replace Perry, with Lancaster reportedly paying for some of the reshoots himself. Among the scenes that were entirely recast and reshot was the notorious Loden scene, with Broadway stage actress Janice Rule replacing Loden. Neither Loden nor Pollack was credited on the film. All that remains of the lost scene are still photos taken on set, which appear in Chris Innis's 2014 documentary The Story of The Swimmer.

1967–1980: Film and theater directing

At some point during her acting career, Loden came across a newspaper article about a woman who, when on trial for accomplice to bank robbery, thanked the judge for her own sentencing. Intrigued by this story, she eventually wrote the screenplay for Wanda, an existential rumination on a poverty-stricken woman adrift in Pennsylvania coal country who becomes embroiled in a similar plot. After sending the script to a number of potential directors, Loden felt that they "didn't seem to understand what this woman was about." Fortuitously, her friend Harry Schuster had offered Loden financing for the film, so she directed it herself in collaboration with cinematographer and editor Nicholas T. Proferes on a meager budget of $115,000.

Wanda is a semi-autobiographical portrait of a "passive, disconnected coal miner's wife who attaches herself to a petty crook." Innovative in its cinéma vérité and improvisational style, it was one of the few American films directed by a woman to be theatrically released at that time. Film critic David Thomson wrote, "Wanda is full of unexpected moments and raw atmosphere, never settling for cliché in situation or character." The film was the only American film accepted by the Venice Film Festival in 1970, where it won the International Critics' Prize, and the only American film presented at the 1971 Cannes Film Festival. In 2010, with support from Gucci, the film was restored by the UCLA Film & Television Archive and screened at the Museum of Modern Art in Manhattan.

Although Wanda never received proper distribution, screening briefly in New York and at universities but never nationally on the theater circuit, it was noted for its groundbreaking anti-Hollywood view of a woman adrift in the American underworld. Loden said of her title character, "She's trying to get out of this very ugly type of existence, but she doesn't have the equipment"—an independent-minded idea for a cinematic heroine at the time, making Wanda an anti-heroine. In 2017, Wanda was selected for preservation in the United States National Film Registry by the Library of Congress for being "culturally, historically, or aesthetically significant".

While Loden never made another feature film, she directed two educational short films for the Learning Corporation of America. The first one, The Frontier Experience, was released in 1975. It depicts a widowed pioneer woman, played by Loden, in Kansas attempting to survive the harsh winter with her children. Described as a "political prequel" to Wanda, the short explores similar themes. The second, The Boy Who Liked Deer, was released in 1978. It is a cautionary tale about vandalism, in which two boys accidentally poison a deer.

Four months before her death, Loden was interviewed in Katja Raganelli's 1980 documentary I Am Wanda. The film documents Loden's final months, when she taught acting classes.

Death
In 1978, Loden was diagnosed with breast cancer. At the time, she had completed several other screenplays with Proferes that Kazan described as "devoted to the neglected side of American life." She and Kazan were estranged at the time of her cancer diagnosis and planning to divorce, but her illness precluded their separation. In June 1980, Loden was working with her acting teacher Paul Mann on a one-act play to be shown on Off-Off-Broadway. She had planned to work as director, producer, and leading actress, but lost the energy to complete the project. In a retrospective, she said "my life was hard too much of the time", but also that she had made her peace with life.

At the time of her diagnosis, Loden was prepared to direct a feature about Kate Chopin's The Awakening, but her cancer treatments prevented her from starting it. She died at Mount Sinai Hospital in New York City from the disease on September 5, 1980.

Style and themes 
Wanda has a cinéma vérité style. Loden rejected Hollywood style, wanting to only present the world "as it actually is". She worked mainly with non-professional actors, which resulted in the film's original script being loosely referenced. The film was made with a skeleton crew of only four people. These two factors led to the film's improvisational style. The visuals in the film were inspired by several Andy Warhol films.

Loden's work as an actress and filmmaker drew inspiration from her own life. She said that the character Maggie, whom Loden won a Tony for portraying, was like her in that she was "not educated" and "had a very strong need to be accepted". Kazan said of Loden's work, "she's always dramatizing her own feelings about something." Like Maggie in After The Fall, Wanda and Delilah Fowler are also uneducated women.

The major theme of Wanda and The Frontier Experience is women's lack of agency. Both films feature mothers in difficult situations. An unmade play by Loden planned to explore these themes further, but was never finished due to her death.

Wanda has been described as a feminist work, but Loden did not intend it to be. It is notable for its portrayal of an unsympathetic woman, which garnered some criticism, notably from Pauline Kael, who called the character "dumb."

Legacy
Experimental filmmaker Marguerite Duras cited Wanda as an inspiration, particularly Loden's ability to inhabit her character onscreen, saying in an interview with Kazan, "I think that there is a miracle in Wanda. Usually there is a distance between the visual representation and the text, as well as the subject and the action. Here this distance is completely nullified; there is an instant and permanent continuity between Barbara Loden and Wanda." Duras described Loden's performance of Wanda's "demoralization" as "sacred, powerful, violent and profound."

Kazan compared Loden's acting technique to Marlon Brando: "There was always an element of improvisation, a surprise, in what she was doing. The only one, as far as I know, who was like that is Brando when he was young. He never knew exactly what he was going to say, therefore everything would come out of his mouth very alive."

Wanda never aspired to be a romanticized crime-spree vision, such as Arthur Penn's Bonnie and Clyde. Loden purposefully favored a gritty documentary approach:

I really hate slick pictures... They're too perfect to be believable. I don't mean just in the look. I mean in the rhythm, in the cutting, the music—everything. The slicker the technique is the slicker the content becomes, until everything turns into Formica, including the people.

With its hand-held camera, anonymous locations, available lighting on 16mm (blown up to 35mm), and improvisation by a mostly amateur cast, critic Richard Brody considers Wanda to be not so much in the tone of the concurrent French New Wave, but more like the improvisational directorial work of John Cassavetes.

Although Loden was one of the very few women directors of the late '60s/early '70s, she didn't consider Wanda a feminist film at the time she was working on it, saying:

When I made Wanda, I didn't know anything about consciousness raising or women's liberation. That had just started when the film was finished. The picture was not about women's liberation. It was really about the oppression of women, of people... Being a woman is unexplored territory, and we're pioneers of a sort, discovering what it means to be a woman.

In 2012, Supplément à la vie de Barbara Loden by acclaimed French author Nathalie Léger was published. The book, taking Wanda and Loden's biography as its inspiration, combines fact and fiction to examine the nature of lived truth. It was translated into English and published as Suite for Barbara Loden in 2016. In 2021, Anna Backman Rogers's book Still Life: Notes on Barbara Loden's "Wanda" (1970) was published. It analyzes the themes of Wanda and discusses its lasting importance.

Filmography

Film

Television

Documentary appearances

Stage credits

Awards and nominations
Tony Award – Best Featured Actress, 1964 (for After the Fall)
International Critics Award — Venice Film Festival, 1970 (for Wanda)

Notes

References

Works cited

Further reading
Reynaud, Bérénice, "For Wanda", in The Last Great American Picture Show, Thomas Elsaesser, Alexander Horwath and Noel King, eds, Amsterdam: Amsterdam University Press, 2004, pp. 223–47.
 Léger, Nathalie, Suite for Barbara Loden
Gorfinkel, Elena. "Wanda’s Slowness: Enduring Insignificance". In On Women’s Film: Across Worlds and Generations, Ivone Margulies & Jeremi Szaniawaki, eds. London: Bloomsbury, 2019. pp. 27-48.
Mörke, Luise (2020). "What's in a Cone? Barbara Loden's Wanda Between Weakness and Resilience." Senses of Cinema 96, October 2020.
Rogers, Anna Backman (2021). Still Life: Notes on Barbara Loden’s Wanda (1970)

External links

 
 
 

1932 births
1980 deaths
American film actresses
American stage actresses
American women film directors
Actors Studio alumni
People from Asheville, North Carolina
People from Marion, North Carolina
Deaths from cancer in New York (state)
Deaths from breast cancer
Film directors from North Carolina
20th-century American actresses
Kazan family
American women screenwriters
Tony Award winners